Ruby Lewis is an American actress and singer. Her work is largely based in musicals and television.

She is known for such television shows as Desperate Housewives, Masters of Sex, Girl Meets World, and Rules of Engagement.

Her work in musicals includes the Cirque du Soleil production Paramour, the musical Baz (based upon the works of Baz Luhrmann), and the touring cast of We Will Rock You.

References

External links

Year of birth missing (living people)
Living people
American film actresses
American television actresses
American women singers
American stage actresses
21st-century American women